Electronic Letters on Computer Vision and Image Analysis (usually abbreviated ELCVIA) is a peer-reviewed open-access scientific journal focusing on computer vision and image analysis (subfields of artificial intelligence) as well as image processing (a subfield of signal processing). It was established in 2002 and is published by the Computer Vision Center (Autonomous University of Barcelona).

Indexing and abstracting
The journal is abstracted and indexed in the following bibliographic databases:
Scopus
Directory of Open Access Journals (DOAJ)
According to  Scopus, the journal has a 2019 CiteScore of 0.9.

See also 
 EURASIP Journal on Advances in Signal Processing

References

External links 
 

Computer science journals
Open access journals
Publications established in 2002
English-language journals